Koen Lenaerts, Baron Lenaerts (born 20 December 1954 in Mortsel) is a Belgian jurist and the President of the Court of Justice of the European Union. He is also a Professor of European Law at the Katholieke Universiteit Leuven and was a member of the Coudenberg group, a Belgian federalist think tank.

Education
Lenaerts obtained a candidate in law (summa cum laude) in 1974 at the Université de Namur. In 1977, he graduated with a licentiate in law at the Katholieke Universiteit Leuven (summa cum laude). He then went on to earn a Master of Laws (LLM) degree at Harvard Law School in 1978, with a Belgian Fulbright scholarship, and a Master in Public Administration (MPA) from the John F. Kennedy School of Government at Harvard University in 1979. In 1982, he obtained a PhD in law at the Katholieke Universiteit Leuven.

Career
Since 1983, Lenaerts has been Professor of European Law at the Katholieke Universiteit Leuven, since 1990 with the title of buitengewoon hoogleraar. He is director of the Institute of European Law of the university. From 1984 until 1989, he was Professor at the College of Europe in Bruges. From 1984 until 1985, he was Law clerk to Judge René Joliet at the Court of Justice of the European Communities. From 1986 until 1989, he was a Member of the Brussels Bar acting as attorney in the European Court of Justice, on behalf of the Belgian state. He was made an Honorary Master of the Bench of the Inner Temple, London, in 2010.

From 1989 until 6 October 2003 Lenearts served as Judge of the European Court of First Instance (now known as the General Court).

Since 7 October 2003 Lenaerts has been a Judge at the European Court of Justice, where he became Vice President in 2012. In October 2015 he became President of the Court of Justice of the European Union and was reelected in this position both in 2018 and 2021. As president, Lenaerts allocates incoming cases to judges and presides over the grand chamber of 15 judges that deals with the most important cases. He is also the public face of the institution.

Other activities
 Academy of European Law (ERA), Ex-Officio Member of the Governing Board
 Max Planck Institute for Comparative Public Law and International Law, Member of the Board of Trustees
 Centre for Governance and Law in Europe at the UCL Faculty of Laws, Member of the Advisory Board
 Columbia Journal of European Law, Member of the Board of Advisors
 European Constitutional Law Review, Member of the Board of Advisors

Recognition
In 2004 Lenaerts was ennobled a baron by King Albert II, King of the Belgians.

Bibliography
 Koen Lenaerts (Author), Piet Van Nuffel (Ed.), Constitutional Law of the European Union, Thomson

See also
List of members of the European Court of Justice

References

External links

Koen Lenaerts at the Faculty of Law, KU Leuven
Remarks of Judge Koen Lenaerts

1954 births
20th-century Belgian judges
Academic staff of the College of Europe
Harkness Fellows
Harvard Law School alumni
Harvard Kennedy School alumni
KU Leuven alumni
Academic staff of KU Leuven
Living people
People from Mortsel
Université de Namur alumni
Vice-Presidents of the European Court of Justice
Presidents of the European Court of Justice
Belgian judges of international courts and tribunals
21st-century Belgian judges